Ballet Shoes is a 2007 British television film, adapted by Heidi Thomas from Noel Streatfeild's 1936 novel Ballet Shoes. It was produced by Granada Productions (formerly Granada Television) and premiered on BBC One on 26 December 2007. It is directed by Sandra Goldbacher.

A previous adaptation of Ballet Shoes was produced in serial 
format by the BBC in 1975 and directed by Timothy Combe. The television film stars Yasmin Paige as Petrova Fossil, Lucy Boynton as Posy Fossil, Emilia Fox as Sylvia Brown, Victoria Wood as Nana and former Harry Potter actors Emma Watson as Pauline Fossil, Gemma Jones as Dr. Jakes, and Richard Griffiths as Gum.

Plot
A practical young orphan, Sylvia Brown, and her stern nurse Nana come to live at her uncle Gum's house in London, England after her parents die tragically. Gum, a paleontologist, is reluctant to take his niece in, but relents when he learns he is her only living relative. Gum is often away collecting fossils, but he sends Sylvia letters and presents, and she comes to love him.

Years later, Sylvia is now grown and still living with Gum and Nana. Gum brings home an orphaned baby girl, whose parents died on the RMS Titanic. He names her Pauline Fossil and legally adopts her. Two years later, Gum adopts Petrova, a Russian baby girl. In 1923, Gum adopts a third baby, Posy, who arrives with her mother's ballet shoes and necklaces for the three girls. Gum explains that Posy's father died and her mother is unable to care for her daughter. He also leaves Sylvia enough money for five years. That is the last the family hears of him.

During The Great Depression, Pauline and Petrova attend school at Cromwell House, but Sylvia cannot afford to send Posy. As Gum's money runs out, Sylvia has to take Pauline and Petrova out of school. To earn money, she takes in four boarders: Theo Dane, an impractical dance teacher; John Simpson, who works with cars; and Dr. Smith and Dr. Jakes, who are retired academics.

Pauline, Petrova, and Posy are inspired by the professors to "put their names in the history books" by giving service to their country. Every Christmas and on birthdays they vow to do that.

Theo encourages Sylvia to have the girls train at the Children's Academy of Dancing and Stage Training, a performing arts school. Sylvia and Nana refuse, but after talking with Theo, Dr. Smith, and Dr. Jakes, Sylvia reluctantly agrees to let the girls be trained so they can earn a living. Meanwhile, Dr. Smith and Dr. Jakes tutor Pauline, Petrova, and Posy. The girls' lives become very busy. Soon Pauline is old enough to perform on stage and auditions for the role of Alice in Alice's Adventures in Wonderland. She loans Gum's necklaces to Mr. Simpson for money to buy a frock, and will pay him back with her wages. Pauline gets the part, and does well as Alice. She gives thirty shillings to Sylvia for housekeeping money. But the role inflates Pauline's ego, and she is rude to Winifred, her understudy. When Pauline loses her temper at Mr. French, the director, she is kicked out of the play and replaced by Winifred.

Madame Fidolia, the owner of the school, notices Posy is talented at ballet and teaches her classical ballet. However, Petrova hates dancing and would rather work with cars and fly planes. She and Mr. Simpson become good friends. Sylvia starts to fall in love with Mr. Simpson. She has bad lungs and her health starts worsening, worrying Petrova.

Petrova and Pauline audition for roles as fairies in A Midsummer Night's Dream. Petrova does badly, but she is hired as no one else auditions for the role. Pauline is also hired. Petrova does poorly at the rehearsals and is almost sacked. She dislikes acting but does it for the money. When A Midsummer Night's Dream ends, Pauline wants to audition with Petrova for another play, but Petrova warns her to stop forcing her go on stage.

The girls and Sylvia go camping. Mr. Simpson comes to tell them that Pauline will be auditioning for a movie, Charles In Exile. She gets the part, but finds film acting difficult and initially dislikes it. After the filming, Pauline and Petrova act in a pantomime of Cinderella. Even with the money from the film and play, Sylvia cannot afford to keep their house, and decides to sell it.

Posy is brought to see Valentin Manoff's ballet by Madame Fidolia. Posy wants to attend his ballet school in Czechoslovakia. Madame has a stroke and is paralysed, leaving Posy devastated. Charles In Exile is a hit, and Pauline has been discovered. She is offered a five-year contract in Hollywood, but she is unsure she should accept it.

Posy runs away, wanting to attend Manoff's ballet.  Pauline signs the contract so that Posy can go to Czechoslovakia with Nana, and Sylvia will go to Hollywood with her. Unexpectedly, Gum returns safe and sound. He agrees to teach Petrova to fly planes. The movie ends with Pauline and Posy vowing to get Petrova into the history books, while Petrova flies over Sylvia and Mr. Simpson's wedding.

Cast
 Emma Watson as Pauline Fossil
 Lucy Watson as Young Pauline
 Yasmin Paige as Petrova Fossil
 Lucy Boynton as Posy Fossil
 Richard Griffiths as Great Uncle Matthew Brown "Gum"
 Victoria Wood as Nana
 Emilia Fox as Sylvia Brown 
 Eileen Atkins as Madame Fidolia
 Peter Bowles as Sir Donald Houghton
 Marc Warren as Mr. John Simpson
 Harriet Walter as Dr. Smith
 Gemma Jones as Dr. Jakes
 Lucy Cohu as Theodora "Theo" Dane
 Heather Nicol as Winifred Bagnall
 Mary Stockley as Miss Jay
 Skye Bennett as a Young Sylvia
 Don Gallagher as Mr. French
 Annabella Anderson as Pauline Fossil's friend
 Nicolette Baker as young girl in red dress.
 Adrian Lester as Mr Sholsky, a film director.

Casting
A July 2007 report from Digital Spy written by Kimberley Dadds announced the involvement of Woods, Griffiths and Warren; the BBC announced that open casting for the roles of the sisters would be a week later. Emilia Fox plays the part of Sylvia Brown in this adaptation; her mother, Joanna David, played the part of Theo Dane in the 1975 BBC adaptation of the same story. Emma Watson, Richard Griffiths and Gemma Jones have all starred in films in the Harry Potter franchise, playing Hermione Granger, Uncle Vernon Dursley and Madam Poppy Pomfrey respectively. In addition, Gemma Jones starred in the 1995 adaptation of Sense and Sensibility as Mrs. Dashwood, while Lucy Boynton (Posy) played Margaret Dashwood in the 2008 BBC adaptation of the same novel. Louise Keller of Urban Cinefile notes that this is Emma Watson's first role other than that of Hermione,  though her voice would later be heard in The Tale of Despereaux. Identical twin girls Lucy and Nina Watson, who take turns playing a younger Pauline in this film, are Emma Watson's younger half-sisters and only appear in the uncut DVD version of the film.

Production
In a press release dated July 2007 it was announced that the film would begin shooting that August. Screenwriter and producer Heidi Thomas called the schedule "murderous".

Both Victoria Wood and Thomas described Streatfeild's novel as a book they have long treasured. Producer Piers Wenger, who said the film has a "strong rites-of-passage story", related the film to the current "cult of the TV talent shows", and said that it "is also a great antidote to the notion of fame for fame's sake".

Broadcast and commercial releases
The film was released on DVD in Europe in Region 2 on 7 January 2008. The film had a limited release in U.S. theaters on 26 August 2008; this can be seen as part of Screenvision's initiative to expand its venue. According to a press release on Screenvision's website, KOCH Vision bought the North American Home Entertainment rights from Granada International and partnered with Screenvision; KOCH Vision President Michael Rosenberg said that the theatrical run would help promote the DVD. Participating theaters promoted the film with a trailer and a poster earlier that August, and Random House promoted the "Shoe Books", in association with the film. Ballet Shoes was released on DVD in North America, Region 1, on 2 September 2008. The film premiered on Christmas Eve on TV ONE in New Zealand. It will be broadcast in Canada on CBC. It was aired in Australia on 7 June 2009.

Reception
On Rotten Tomatoes, the film has an approval rating of 100% based on reviews from 6 critics, with an average rating of 7.7/10.

Wayne Myers of The Oneida Daily Dispatch called it an "embraceable film of the sort that emerges more frequently from elsewhere nowadays than Hollywood", and praised the performances of Paige, Watson, Boynton and Nicol. Brian Orndorf wrote that Emilia Fox as Sylvia "forms the spine of the story" and that Goldbacher "is cautious to silently weave the performance throughout the film to undercut any saccharine temptations." Betty Joe Tucker of ReelTalk Movie Reviews praised the way film evokes the 1930s. Gina Catanzarite, in a review for Parents' Choice, suggested that there may be too much plot material for the film's relatively short running time.

References

External links
 
 

BBC television dramas
Films about ballet
British television films
2007 television films
2007 films

ja:バレエ・シューズ (小説)#映像化